Glyceollin I is a glyceollin, a type of prenylated pterocarpan. It is a phytoalexin found in the soybean.

Glyceollin synthase is an enzyme responsible for the production of glyceollin. The five substrates of this enzyme are 2-dimethylallyl-(6aS,11aS)-3,6a,9-trihydroxypterocarpan, 4-dimethylallyl-(6aS,11aS)-3,6a,9-trihydroxypterocarpan, NADPH, H+, and O2, whereas its three products are glyceollin, NADP+, and H2O.

In in vitro studies, this molecule has been shown to exhibit antiestrogenic properties.

References 

Antiestrogens

Pterocarpans
Phytoalexins